The trochlear fovea is a slight depression on the anteromedial orbital surface of the orbital plate of the frontal bone. Attached to the trochlear fovea is the trochlea of the superior oblique muscle.

References 

Bones of the head and neck